In mathematics, a  Demazure module, introduced by , is a submodule of a finite-dimensional representation generated by an extremal weight space under the action of a Borel subalgebra.
The dimension of a Demazure module is a polynomial in the highest weight, called a Demazure polynomial.

Demazure modules

Suppose that g is a complex semisimple Lie algebra, with a Borel subalgebra b containing a Cartan subalgebra h. An irreducible finite-dimensional representation V of g splits as a sum of eigenspaces of h, and the highest weight space is 1-dimensional and is an eigenspace of b. The Weyl group W acts on the weights of V, and the conjugates wλ of the highest weight vector λ under this action are the extremal weights, whose weight spaces are all 1-dimensional.

A Demazure module is the b-submodule of V generated by the weight space of an extremal vector wλ, so the Demazure submodules of V are parametrized by the Weyl group W.

There are two extreme cases: if w is trivial the Demazure module is just 1-dimensional, and if w is the element of maximal length of W then the Demazure module is the whole of the irreducible representation V.

Demazure modules can be defined in a similar way for highest weight representations of Kac–Moody algebras,  except that one now has 2 cases as one can consider the submodules generated by either the Borel subalgebra b or its opposite subalgebra. In the finite-dimensional these are exchanged by the longest element of the Weyl group, but this is no longer the case in infinite dimensions as there is no longest element.

Demazure character formula

History

Statement

The Demazure character formula is

Here:
w is an element of the Weyl group, with reduced decomposition w = s1...sn as a product of reflections of simple roots.
λ is a lowest weight, and eλ the corresponding element of the group ring of the weight lattice.
Ch(F(wλ)) is the character of the Demazure module F(wλ).
P is the weight lattice, and Z[P] is its group ring.
Δα for α a root is the endomorphism of the Z-module Z[P] defined by

and Δj is Δα for α the root of sj

References

Representation theory